The Neal Somers Alexander House is a historic house located at 5014 North Sharon Amity Road near Charlotte, Mecklenburg County, North Carolina.

Description and history 
It was built in 1903, and is a -story, Queen Anne style frame dwelling with Colonial Revival style design elements. It has an asymmetrical form with projecting wings, a wraparound porch, patterned slate roof, Palladian window, and signature corner tower. It was built by Neal Somers Alexander (1855–1926) a wealthy farmer and the great-grandson of Hezekiah Alexander.

It was listed on the National Register of Historic Places on May 7, 2008.

References

Houses on the National Register of Historic Places in North Carolina
Queen Anne architecture in North Carolina
Colonial Revival architecture in North Carolina
Houses completed in 1903
Houses in Charlotte, North Carolina
National Register of Historic Places in Mecklenburg County, North Carolina